CEGE or Cege may refer to:

Center for European Governance and Economic Development Research, a research institute at the University of Göttingen
Comité de Enlace del Guidismo en España, the national guiding association of Spain
Cege, the Hungarian name for Țaga Commune, Romania

See also
Cege wa Kibiru, a Kenyan religious leader